Mehdi Nasiri (born 11 November 1987 in Isfahan, Iran) is an Iranian association footballer who currently plays for Giti Pasand Fc in Azadegan League.

Club career

Club career statistics 
Last Update  24 November 2012 

 Assist Goals

Honours

Club
Sepahan
Iran Pro League (2): 2010–11, 2011–12

References

1987 births
Living people
Sportspeople from Isfahan
Giti Pasand players
Iranian footballers
Sepahan S.C. footballers
Association football defenders